Agnes Windeck (27 March 1888 – 28 September 1975) was a German theatre and film actress. She appeared in more than 50 films between 1939 and 1973. She was born in Hamburg and started her career at the Deutsches Schauspielhaus in 1904. She later worked as a teacher at the drama school of the Deutsches Theater in Berlin. In the 1930s she began to play minor roles in several films but it was not until she was in her seventies when she became a popular character actress of West German cinema and television.

Selected filmography

 The Merciful Lie (1939)
 The Great Love (1942)
 Back Then (1943)
 The Years Pass (1945)
 Street Acquaintances (1948)
 Three Girls Spinning (1950)
 The Uncle from America (1953)
 Such a Charade (1953)
 Christina (1953)
 How Do I Become a Film Star? (1955)
 Vater sein dagegen sehr (1957)
 The Trapp Family (1956)
 The Copper (1958)
 A Time to Love and a Time to Die (1958)
 The Ideal Woman (1959)
 Peter Shoots Down the Bird (1959)
 Only a Woman (1962)
 Gripshom Castle (1963)
 My Daughter and I (1963)
 The Squeaker (1963)
 Scotland Yard Hunts Dr. Mabuse (1963)
 The Hunchback of Soho (1966)
 Die Unverbesserlichen (TV series, 6 episodes, 1966–71)
 Rheinsberg (1967)
 The Hound of Blackwood Castle (1968)
 Morning's at Seven (1968)
 Gentlemen in White Vests (1970)
 Old Barge, Young Love (1973)

References

External links

1888 births
1975 deaths
German film actresses
German stage actresses
German television actresses
Actresses from Hamburg
20th-century German actresses
Rundfunk im amerikanischen Sektor people